Barbecue is a method and apparatus for cooking meat, poultry and occasionally fish with the heat and hot smoke of a fire, smoking wood, or hot coals of charcoal.

Barbecue may also refer to:

Places
 Barbecue Township, Harnett County, North Carolina, U.S.
 Barbecue, North Carolina, an unincorporated community in Barbecue Township

Arts, entertainment, and media
 Barbecue (film), a 2014 French film
 Barbecue (G.I. Joe), a fictional character in the G.I. Joe universe

People
 Jimmy Chérizier (born 1976 or 1977), known by his pseudonym Barbecue, a Haitian gang leader
 BBQ, a pseudonym for one-man band Mark Sultan (b. 1973)

See also
 Barbecue sauce is a sauce or topping for meat cooked
 BabaKiueria, a 1986 Australian satirical film
 BBQ (disambiguation)